"Long Time Gone" is a bluegrass song by American musician Darrell Scott, originally recorded by him on his 2000 album Real Time which Scott recorded together with Tim O'Brien. The song was later covered by the American band Dixie Chicks, and served as the lead single to their 2002 album Home.

Content
The song chronicles a young person's journey away from his family farm to Nashville to become a musician, and eventually back to his hometown, where he settles down to raise a family. The song's last verse criticizes contemporary country music as having no soul, referencing several famous country musicians:

Despite its upbeat bluegrass melody, the song's lyrics resolve to a very pessimistic outlook on the future of music.

Dixie Chicks version
American country music band The Chicks, then known as Dixie Chicks, recorded the song for their 2003 album Home. Released in May 2002 as the lead single, it reached a peak of number 2 on the Billboard Hot Country Songs chart and number 7 on the Billboard Hot 100 chart. Their version won a Grammy Award for Best Country Vocal Performance by a Duo or Group.

The Chicks' version, like the rest of Home, features heavy influence of bluegrass music, with fiddle and banjo, and no drums. The song's sound and message were described by journalist Bill Frisicks-Warren as atypical of country music at the time, although group member Martie Maguire said she did not consider the song to be a "statement". Prior to the song's release to radio, the band performed it on the VH1 show Divas Las Vegas on May 23, 2002 and released it to radio that same day.

Critical reception
Chuck Taylor of Billboard reviewed the single favorably, calling it "good old-fashioned country" while praising the use of fiddle and banjo in the production. Kevin John Coyne of Country Universe ranked it as the best song by the Chicks, writing that "It features the same empowered energy of their best hits...but with a sharper edge and a complete refusal to mince words as they slice and dice the contemporary country landscape that they still ruled at the time."

Chart positions

Weekly charts

Year-end charts

References

2000 songs
2002 singles
The Chicks songs
Music videos directed by Marcus Raboy
Songs written by Darrell Scott
Columbia Records singles
Song recordings produced by Lloyd Maines
Songs about country music
Songs about Tennessee